Luhansk, also known as Lugansk, is a city in Ukraine, although currently it is occupied by Russia. As of 2022, the population was estimated to be , making Luhansk the most populous city in the region and the 12th-largest in Ukraine. In 2001, nearly half of the population was ethnically Ukrainian, and 47% was ethnically Russian.

Luhansk has been the capital and administrative center of Luhansk Oblast, although the Ukrainian administration was relocated to Sievierodonetsk when the war in Donbas broke out following the establishment of the LPR.

Etymology
Luhansk was named after the Luhan River, which flows through the city. According to folk etymology, the name is also derived to the word "Luh" (Ukrainian: Луг), which means "meadow", referring to the floodplains around the river.

History

The city traces its history to 1795 when the British industrialist Charles Gascoigne founded a metal factory near the Zaporizhian Cossacks settlement Kamianyi Brid. The settlement around the factory was known as Luganskiy Zavod. In 1882 the factory settlement Luganskiy Zavod was merged with the town of Kamianyi Brid into the city of Luhansk (also Luhanske, according to the Kharkiv orthography).

Located in the Donets Basin, Luhansk developed into an important industrial center of Eastern Europe, particularly as a home to the major locomotive-building company Luhanskteplovoz. The city was occupied by Nazi Germany between 14 July 1942 and 14 February 1943.

On 5 November 1935, the city was renamed Voroshilovgrad in honour of Soviet military commander and politician Kliment Voroshilov. On 5 March 1958, after Khrushchev's call to not name cities after living people, the old name was reinstated.

On 5 January 1970, after the death of Voroshilov on 2 December 1969, the name changed again to Voroshilovgrad. On 4 May 1990, a decree of the Supreme Soviet of the Ukrainian SSR gave the city back its original name.

In 1994 a consultative referendum took place in the Donetsk Oblast and the Luhansk Oblast, with around 90% supporting the Russian language gaining status of an official language alongside Ukrainian, and for the Russian language to be an official language on a regional level.

During the war in Donbas, separatists seized governmental buildings in the region, proclaiming the Luhansk People's Republic. An independence referendum, unconstitutional under Ukrainian law, was held on 11 May 2014. This referendum was not recognized as legitimate by any government.

In August 2014, Ukrainian government forces completely surrounded rebel-held Luhansk. Heavy shelling caused civilian casualties in the city. On 17 August, Ukrainian soldiers entered the rebel-controlled Luhansk and for a time had control over a police station.

After the Ilovaisk counteroffensive, LPR forces regained Lutuhyne and other Luhansk suburbs. Ukrainian forces withdrew from the Luhansk International Airport on 1 September 2014, after heavy fighting.

Luhansk became the capital and the administrative center of the rebel state of the Luhansk People's Republic. The administration of the Luhansk Oblast was moved to Sievierodonetsk by the government of Ukraine.

On September 30, 2022, during the Russian invasion of Ukraine, Russian President Vladimir Putin signed a decree declaring the annexation of four regions of Ukraine (Luhansk, Donetsk, Kherson and Zaporizhiya Oblasts) to Russia. The annexation was illegal under international law and was condemned by the General Assembly of the United Nations.

Raions in the city (City districts) 

 Artemivskyi Raion
 city of Oleksandrivsk
 urban-type settlement Yuvileine
 Kamiano-Bridskyi Raion
 Zhovtnevyi Raion
 Leninskyi Raion

Higher education 
Some of the more prestigious universities in Ukraine have their home in Luhansk. Luhansk is the location of the main campus of the Taras Shevchenko National University of Luhansk, East Ukrainian Volodymyr Dahl National University and of Luhansk State Medical University.

Demographics

In the Ukrainian Census of 2001, 49.6% of the inhabitants declared themselves as ethnically Ukrainians and 47% as Russians. 85.3% of the population spoke Russian as their native language, while 13.7% spoke Ukrainian, 0.2% Armenian and 0.1% Belarusian.

Sport
Luhansk is home to Zorya Luhansk which now plays in the Ukrainian Premier League annual football championship and plays at the Avanhard Stadium. The club won the 1972 Soviet Top League.

The other football team was Dynamo Luhansk.

Merheleva Ridge

On 7 September 2006, archaeologists in Ukraine announced that an ancient structure had been discovered near Luhansk, which the press reported as a pyramid antedating those in Egypt by at least 300 years. The stone foundations of the structure were said to resemble Aztec and Mayan pyramids in Mesoamerica. It was later concluded that the site in question was not a pyramid but was still of great interest.

Gallery
During 2014 and 2015, Luhansk has been the scene of intense fighting and most of these buildings are damaged to some extent. Some may be destroyed.

Climate
Luhansk has a hot summer humid continental climate (Köppen Dfa). Luhansk has both the highest and lowest temperature recorded in Ukraine.

Notable people

 Vladislav Anisovich (1908–1969) a Russian and Soviet painter and art educator
 Vladimir Bobrov (1915–1970) a Soviet fighter pilot and flying ace
 Nadiya Bychkova (born 1989) a Ukrainian-Slovenian ballroom and Latin American dancer
 Vladimir Dal (1801–1872), Russian lexicographer and polyglot
 Dov Feigin (1907-2000) an Israeli sculptor.
 Pavel Luspekayev (1927—1970) a Soviet actor
 Yulia Malinovsky (born 1975), Israeli politician
 Mikhail Matusovsky (1915–1990), Soviet poet, songwriter
 Julia Rysina (born 1989) stage name T-DJ Milana, DJ, composer, dancer and model
 Leonid Pasechnik (born 1970) leader of the self-proclaimed Luhansk People's Republic.
 Igor Plotnitsky (born 1964) former leader of the self-proclaimed Luhansk People's Republic.
 Andriy Portnov (born 1973) a Ukrainian lawyer and politician.
 Aleksandr Ptushko (1900–1973) a Soviet animation and fantasy film director
 Nikolay Shmatko (1943–2020), sculptor, professor and painter
 Tatyana Snezhina (1972–1995) a Russian poet and singer-songwriter.
 Kostiantyn Sytnyk (1926–2017) a Ukrainian and Soviet scientist and academician
 Kliment Voroshilov (1881–1969), Soviet military commander
 Yevheniy Yevtukhov (born 1984) stage name DJ Sender  a Ukrainian DJ, music producer, songwriter and singer

Sport 
 Sergey Andreyev (born 1956) a football manager and a former player with 617 club caps and 26 for the Soviet Union
 Valeriy Brumel (1942–2003), a Soviet high jumper; silver medallist at the 1960 Summer Olympics and gold medallist at the 1964 Summer Olympics
 Viktor Bryzhin (born 1962) a former sprinter, team gold medallist at the 1988 Summer Olympics.
 Yelyzaveta Bryzhina (born 1989), sprinter, team bronze medallist at the 2012 Summer Olympics
 Sergey Bubka (born 1963), Soviet and Ukrainian pole vaulter, former World Record holder, and gold medallist at the 1988 Summer Olympics
 Vasiliy Bubka (born 1960), Soviet and Ukrainian pole vaulter
 Fedor Emelianenko (born 1976), Russian heavyweight mixed martial arts and judoka
 Vyacheslav Glazkov (born 1984)  boxer, bronze medallist at the 2008 Summer Olympics
 Irina Kirichenko (1937–2020) a Soviet sprint cyclist 
 Serhiy Malyi (born 1990) footballer with over 150 club caps and 46 for Kazakhstan
 Viktor Onopko (born 1969), Russian football player with 462 club caps and 109 for Russia 
 Sergei Semak (born 1976), footballer and manager with 552 club caps and 65 for Russia
 Andriy Serdinov (born 1982), butterfly swimmer, bronze medallist at the 2004 Summer Olympics.
 Oleh Shelayev ( born 1976) footballer with over 400 club caps and 36 for Ukraine 
 Anton Shoutvin (born 1989), Israeli basketball player 
 Tetyana Skachko (born 1954) long jumper, bronze medallist at the 1980 Summer Olympics
 Tetyana Tereshchuk-Antipova (born 1969), hurdler, bronze medallist at the 2004 Summer Olympics 
 Sergei Yuran (born 1969), football player with 276 club caps and 25 for Russia 
 Oleksandr Zavarov (born 1961), Soviet and Ukrainian football player and coach with over 450 club caps and 41 for the Soviet Union

International relations

Luhansk is twinned with:
 Cardiff, United Kingdom
 Lublin, Poland
 Székesfehérvár, Hungary
 Daqing, China
 Saint-Étienne, France
 Pernik, Bulgaria

See also
 Luhansk Airlines
 Luhansk Airport
 Luhanskteplovoz
 Merheleva Ridge
 Aviation Technical Museum (Luhansk)

References

External links

Official website of the Luhansk city council
Former website of the Luhansk city council (last updated July 2015) 
Topographic map 1:100 000

 
Cities in Luhansk Oblast
Slavyanoserbsky Uyezd
Donetsk–Krivoy Rog Soviet Republic
Populated places established in 1795
Cities of regional significance in Ukraine
Populated places established in the Russian Empire
Donets
City name changes in the Soviet Union
Former Soviet toponymy in Ukraine
Oblast centers in Ukraine
1795 establishments in Europe
Territorial disputes of Ukraine